Plougrescant is a commune in the Côtes-d'Armor department of Brittany in northwestern France.

Population

Inhabitants of Plougrescant are called plougrescantais in French.

Sights
 The Saint-Gonéry chapel and its cross including a pulpit, listed as a historical monument.
 The Saint-Gonéry fountain, listed as a historical monument.
 The parish church of Saint-Pierre
 The chapel of Kéralio, listed as a historical monument
 The small house of the abyss located between two rocks in Castel Meur, whose postcard has gone around the world. Built in 1861, it now belongs to the descendants of the first owner. Any commercial representation of this house is prohibited.
 The Protestant temple of Plougrescant, built in 1902
 The Gouffre where dolerite veins can be observed intercalated in the local rock, the microgranodiorite of Pleubian.
 La Pointe du Château (br) where the quartz diorite outcrops (also called Castel Meur diorite)
 The island of Pors Scaff, made up of the Ile aux Pins and the Ile Yvinec.
 The beaches of Gouermel, Pors-hir, Pors scaff, etc.

See also
Communes of the Côtes-d'Armor department

References

External links

Official website 

Communes of Côtes-d'Armor